The Igăzău is a left tributary of the river Pogăniș in Romania. It flows into the Pogăniș near Valeadeni.

References

Rivers of Romania
Rivers of Caraș-Severin County